Syed Imran Abbas Naqvi (born 15 October 1982), professionally known by his stage name Imran Abbas, is a Pakistani actor and model who works predominantly in Urdu television. Abbas made his acting debut with Umrao Jaan Ada in 2003 and later on appeared numerous serials. He get widely recognized after portraying Hammad Raza in 2011 series Khuda Aur Mohabbat, which proved to be a turning point in his career.

Abbas is best known for his roles Adeel in Dil-e-Muztar (2013) for which he received a nomination for Best actor popular in Hum Awards and Hadi Salman in Alvida (2015) which earned him Best on-screen couple with Sanam Jung. His other notable works include Akbari Asghari (2011), Mera Naam Yousuf Hai (2015), Tum Kon Piya (2016), Mohabbat Tumse Nafrat Hai (2017) and Koi Chand Rakh (2018).

In 2014, Abbas made his Bollywood debut in Vikram Bhatt's horror thriller Creature 3D opposite Bipasha Basu and later appeared on Jaanisaar.

Early life and career

Abbas was born on 15 October 1982 in Islamabad. His Father Syed Zulfiqar Husayn Naqvi was a Civil Engineer in Syria. His family moved from Lucknow to Lahore during the partition of 1947 between India and Pakistan and the Family moved to Islamabad in 1965. Abbas has 6 Elder Siblings (4 Sisters and 2 Brothers), Abbas is the youngest of all Siblings. He completed his graduation in National College of Arts, Lahore as his Father he took the field of Civil Engineering and He qualified in Architecture. He began his career at the age of 20 working as a model. He made his first television appearance in Umrao Jaan Ada (2003). He also writes Urdu poetry. Abbas appeared in Pakistani dramas, telefilms, soaps and films. He has also appeared in Bollywood productions.

Bollywood career
He made his debut in Bollywood opposite Bipasha Basu in Vikram Bhatt's Creature 3D, for which he was nominated at Filmfare Award for Best Male Debut category. In 2015, Abbas featured in Jaanisaar directed by Muzaffar Ali alongside Pernia Qureshi.

Filmography

Films

Television

Guest Roles in Television

Telefilm

Other Appearances

Discography

Accolades

See also 
 Ayeza Khan - Worked together in Tum Kon Piya, Mohabbat Tumse Nafrat Hai, Koi Chand Rakh, Dekh Kabira Roya (Telefilm), Thora Sa Haq
 Ayesha Khan - Worked together in Mujhe Apna Bana Lo, Abdullah (Telefilm), Man-O-Salwa
 Fawad Khan - Worked Together in Akbari Asghari, Ae Dil Hai Mushkil
 Sanam Jung - Worked together in Dil-e-Muztar, Alvidaa

References

External links

 

Living people
Pakistani male television actors
Pakistani male models
Muhajir people
21st-century Pakistani male singers
People from Lahore
National College of Arts alumni
1977 births